The Birthday Boys is an American sketch comedy television series that premiered on IFC on October 18, 2013, starring the sketch comedy troupe of the same name.  The show's two seasons consisted of ten episodes each.

Cast
Jefferson Dutton
Dave Ferguson
Mike Hanford
Tim Kalpakis
Matt Kowalick
Mike Mitchell
Chris VanArtsdalen

Recurring
Bob Odenkirk

Episodes

Series overview

Season 1 (2013)

Season 2 (2014)

References

External links

2010s American sketch comedy television series
2013 American television series debuts
IFC (American TV channel) original programming
Television series by Abso Lutely Productions
Television series by Red Hour Productions
2014 American television series endings